Al-Musannah or Al-Mussanah is a town and province in the Batinah Region of northern Oman. As of 2020 Ecensus it had a population of 99,204.

See also
 Oman

References

Populated places in Oman
Al Batinah South Governorate